The Bank of Canada was granted a charter on August 16, 1858. The charter was granted to William Cayley, Joseph Curran Morrison, Angus Morrison Esq., John Ross, William Henry Boulton Esq. and Frederick William Cumberland Esq. The charter was never used and eventually sold to William McMaster in 1866 and renamed the Canadian Bank of Commerce, later became CIBC.

It is not to be mistaken for the Bank of Canada, the current central bank which was established by the Bank of Canada Act in 1934.

References

Defunct banks of Canada
Banks established in 1858
Banks disestablished in 1866
1866 disestablishments in Canada
Canadian companies established in 1858